Richard Dowdeswell  may refer to:
Richard Dowdeswell (died 1673), MP for Tewkesbury 1660–1673
Richard Dowdeswell (died 1711), MP for Tewkesbury 1685–1710